Turn Back is the third studio album by the American rock group Toto released in 1981. Although it yielded the band's first top-ten hit in Japan and steady sales in that country, the album was a commercial disappointment elsewhere, failing to produce any charting singles and selling approximately 900,000 copies worldwide.

Background
Turn Back was recorded with Geoff Workman, who worked as the engineer for Queen, as well as producer and engineer for the Cars, Journey, and Foreigner. The band's intention behind the album was to become an "arena rock band" and emphasize a heavier rock sound. Toto guitarist and vocalist Steve Lukather has credited Workman for providing the album a "new and very different sound" consisting of virtually no mid-range.

The album contained the band's first Japanese hit, "Goodbye Elenore", but the song failed to chart in the U.S., receiving only moderate rock radio airplay. Turn Back is also noteworthy for containing the first Toto track written by Lukather, the rocker "Live for Today." Despite the band's confidence in the album, Turn Back was a commercial failure, making it no higher than 41 on Billboard's 200 chart. Lukather partially attributed the album's lack of success to the band's refusal to film videos using the recorded album tracks, instead opting for a live rendition of "Goodbye Elenore" which received no MTV airplay. The album was also not helped by what Lukather describes as "scathing reviews." Toto did not tour in support of Turn Back.

The commercial failure of Turn Back put Toto in a precarious position with Columbia Records, which threatened to terminate the band's contract if they did not produce a hit for their next album. The band would meet the challenge in 1982 with the hit album Toto IV.

In 2018, Turn Back was remastered by longtime Toto collaborator Elliot Scheiner from the original master tapes and re-released as part of Toto's "All In" career retrospective. Of Toto's early albums, Turn Back was most in need of remastering, with the original CD, in particular, suffering from poor sound quality.

Lukather said in 2013 that it was the band's "fuck you record". He further said: We wanted to prove we were an arena rock band. It’s probably the weirdest record we’ve done, certainly sonically, but we were really proud of it when it came out. It didn't really catch on -- over the years, it's sold, and now it's kind of a cult favorite with fans, but at the time it was kind of a stiff. And then we panicked -- we never even went on the road for that one. The record company was like, "Okay, guys. We let you do what you want to do. Are you gonna give us a hit record? Because if you don't, we’re gonna drop you."

Reception

AllMusic writer William Ruhlmann wrote that the album had no memorable songs, but that it had "those famous chops that Toto possessed in abundance". Ruhlmann also thought that the album's title should have been Fall Back, because the bandmembers always had their studio jobs to fall back on. Lukather also recalls one reviewer noting that Turn Back was an appropriate album title because "that is what you should do when you buy this record."

Track listing

Personnel 
Toto
 Bobby Kimball – lead vocals , backing vocals
 Steve Lukather – guitars, lead vocals , backing vocals
 David Paich – keyboards, synthesizers, backing vocals
 Steve Porcaro – keyboards, electronics
 David Hungate – bass guitar, acoustic guitar on "I Think I Could Stand You Forever"
 Jeff Porcaro – drums, percussion

Additional personnel
 Joe Porcaro – additional percussion on "If It's the Last Night"

Production
 Producers – Toto and Geoff Workman
 Engineer and Mixing – Geoff Workman
 Recordist – John Weaver
 Live Mix – Leo Bonamy
 Mastered by George Marino and Nestor Iencenella at Sterling Sound (New York, NY).
 Technicians – Ralph Dyck, Roger Linn, Guy Moore (drums), Bruce Heigh (guitars), Paul Jamieson (keyboards) and Shep Lonsdale (production/stage mix).
 Crew – Chris Littleton
 Photography – Sam Emerson and John Cosgrove
 Management – Dick Gall

Charts

Weekly charts

Sales

References

Toto (band) albums
1981 albums
Columbia Records albums
Hard rock albums by American artists